The parliament of the Sri Lanka has set of ministers. They are categorized either as the ministers of cabinet and non cabinet. According to the 19th amendment the number of cabinet ministers is limited to 28.

List of ministries
Ministry of Defence
Minister of Defence
Ministry of Finance, Economic Stabilization and National Policies
Minister of Finance, Economic Stabilization and National Policies
Ministry of Technology
Minister of Technology
Ministry of Women, Child Affairs and Social Empowerment
Minister of Women, Child Affairs and Social Empowerment
Ministry of Ports, Shipping and Aviation
Minister of Ports, Shipping and Aviation
Ministry of Investment Promotion
Minister of Investment Promotion
Ministry of Public Administration, Home Affairs, Provincial Councils and Local Government
 Minister of Public Administration, Home Affairs, Provincial Councils and Local Government
Ministry of Fisheries
Minister of Fisheries
Ministry of Education
Minister of Education
Ministry of Transport and Highways
Minister of Transport and Highways
Ministry of Mass Media
Minister of Mass Media
Ministry of Health
Minister of Health
Ministry of Water Supply
Minister of Water Supply
Ministry of Agriculture
Minister of Agriculture
Ministry of Wildlife and Forest Resources Conservation
Minister of Wildlife and Forest Resources Conservation
Ministry of Justice, Prisons Affairs and Constitutional Reforms
Minister of Justice, Prisons Affairs and Constitutional Reforms
Ministry of Tourism and Lands
Minister of Tourism and Lands
Ministry of Plantation Industries
Minister of Plantation Industries
Ministry of Industries
Minister of Industries
Ministry of Urban Development and Housing
Minister of Urban Development and Housing
Ministry of Foreign Affairs
Minister of Foreign Affairs
Ministry of Buddha Sasana, Religious and Cultural Affairs
Minister of Buddha Sasana, Religious and Cultural Affairs
Ministry of Power and Energy
Minister of Power and Energy
Ministry of Environment
Minister of Environment
Ministry of Sports and Youth Affairs
Minister of Sports and Youth Affairs
Ministry of Irrigation
Minister of Irrigation
Ministry of Labour and Foreign Employment
Minister of Labour and Foreign Employment
Ministry of Public Security
Minister of Public Security
Ministry of Trade, Commerce and Food Security
Minister of Trade, Commerce and Food Security

Former ministries
Ministry of Economic Development
Ministry of External Affairs and Defence
Ministry of Highways, Ports & Shipping (briefly Ministry of Highways and Investment Promotion)
Ministry of Livestock and Rural Community Development
Ministry of Parliamentary Affairs
Ministry of Productivity Promotion
Ministry of Traditional Industries and Small Enterprise Development

See also

Cabinet of Sri Lanka
Presidential Secretariat
Cabinet Office (Sri Lanka)

References

External links
 Government of Sri Lanka Official Web Portal
 List of Cabinet Ministries of Sri Lanka
 List of Cabinet Ministers of Sri Lanka

Government of Sri Lanka
 
Sri Lanka politics-related lists
Sri Lanka